Edward Somerton, or Somertoune (died 1461) was an Irish barrister and judge who held the offices of Serjeant-at-law (Ireland) and judge of the Court of King's Bench (Ireland) and the Court of Common Pleas (Ireland). He was born in Ireland, possibly in Waterford, although he lived much of his life in Dublin. By 1426 he was a clerk in the Court of Chancery (Ireland), and was paid 26 shillings for his labours in preparing writs and enrolment of indentures, i.e. agreements between the  Lord Lieutenant of Ireland  and former Irish enemies of the Crown In 1427 he is recorded in London studying law at Lincoln's Inn. He returned to Ireland and was again in the Crown service by 1435, when he was ordered to convey lands at Beaulieu, County  Louth to Robert Chambre,  one of the Barons of the  Court of Exchequer (Ireland).Patent Roll 13 Henry VI He was appointed King's Serjeant for life in 1437; he also acted as counsel for the city of Waterford, a position subsequently held by another future judge, John Gough.

Serjeant-at-law 

His duties as Serjeant were onerous (he was the equivalent of a Government minister nowadays), and he complained that his salary of £9 per annum was entirely inadequate, given his workload. The Crown agreed to his demand for an increase, and in 1440 his salary was supplemented by an additional 100 shillings a year. His successor, Thomas Snetterby (who held office 1447–55), later made similar complaints about the low pay of an Irish Law Officer, as did the Attorney General for Ireland, Robert FitzRery (who held office 1450–63), and both men received the same additional payment, which was charged, in all three cases, on certain lands at Chapelizod and Leixlip.

In 1441, due to serious concerns about the lawless state of the southern half of the  country, the Privy Council appointed Somerton and William Chevir, justice of the Court of King's Bench, to a commission of oyer and terminer to "execute the laws" in 6 counties of Leinster and Munster.

His period as King's Serjeant, then the Crown's senior legal adviser, was one of great political turbulence, marked by fierce conflict between the rival Butler and Talbot factions, with both parties contending to dominate the Government. His name appears frequently in the Patent Rolls in connection with the various political controversies of the time. There is good reason to think that he personally tried to stay neutral in the conflict and to maintain friendly relations with men on both sides of the dispute. Although Robert Dyke, the Master of the Rolls in Ireland from 1436 to 1449, was a firm supporter of the  Butler side in the feud and necessarily hostile to the Talbot faction, Somerton valued him highly as an "honest and honourable man"  who had given many years of good service to the  Crown. It was on his nomination that Dyke was made Lord Treasurer of Ireland in 1444. Both of them were witnesses to the royal charter of 1446 whereby the liberties of Dublin Corporation were confirmed.

Politician 

He was a member of the Privy Council of Ireland. In that capacity he "spoke as the mouth of the Council" at its meeting at Trim, County Meath on 5 June 1442, when Richard Wogan, the Lord Chancellor of Ireland, and a prominent member of the Talbot faction, was questioned about certain articles he had sent to the Parliament of England denouncing his political enemy, James Butler, 4th Earl of Ormonde, the head of the Butler faction, who was three times Lord Lieutenant of Ireland. After the council, in Wogan's absence, had examined the articles, Somerton, who was described as the Prolocutor (or Chairman) of the council, declared that the council found the charges against Ormonde to be false, and further declared that Wogan had acted without their authority in sending the articles to the English Parliament.

Judge 

In 1447 he was appointed second justice of the Court of King's Bench; unusually he was appointed by Act of Parliament. He was to receive the same fee as his predecessor William Chevir. In 1457 he asked for permission to found a chantry at the Church of St. Nicholas Within, Dublin (which has largely disappeared), and Parliament granted his request the following year. He was transferred to the Court of Common Pleas as second justice in February 1458. In 1452 he was given joint custody of the lands of Nicholas Holywood deceased during the minority of his son and heir Robert, and the right of Robert's marriage. He  died in 1461.

References

Sources
Ball, F. Elrington The Judges in Ireland 1221-1921 London John Murray 1926
Hart, A.R. A History of the King's Serjeants-at-law in Ireland Dublin Four Courts Press 2000
Morrin, James Calendar of the Patent and Close Rolls of Chancery in Ireland of the 18th to the 45th Queen Elizabeth Dublin Alexander Thom and Co 1862.
Close  Rolls Henry VI 
Patent Rolls Henry VI

1461 deaths
Members of Lincoln's Inn
Year of birth unknown
Justices of the Irish King's Bench
Serjeants-at-law (Ireland)